Oksana Valentinovna Skaldina is a retired Ukrainian individual rhythmic gymnast and current coach. She is the 1992 Olympic bronze medalist and 1991 all-around world champion.

Biography 
Skaldina was born on 24 May 1972 in Zaporizhia, Ukrainian SSR, to an engineer and a kindergarten inspector.

Skaldina started training in gymnastics at the age of 5 with Lyudmila Kovalik. When she moved to Kyiv, she began training at the Deryugins School with Albina and Irina Deriugina.

Skaldina's breakthrough came at the 1988 European Cup, where she placed fifth in the all-around and won the ball title. She shared in the Soviet silver-medal finish behind Bulgaria at the 1989 World Championships, and also claimed the all-around bronze and three golds (rope, hoop, ribbon). In 1990, she placed first at the Intervision Cup, Goodwill Games, USSR National Championships and World Cup, third at the European Championships, and became the 1991 World All-around champion.

Following the break-up of the Soviet Union, Skaldina and her teammate Olexandra Tymoshenko, both coached by the Deryuginas, competed for Ukraine at the 1992 European Championships in Stuttgart. Skaldina placed fifth in the all-around and won three apparatus gold medals. At the 1992 Summer Olympics, the ex-USSR countries qualified as one Unified Team based on their results as the Soviet team the previous year. Although Russia's Oxana Kostina had a better competitive season, Skaldina was named to the Olympic team along with compatriot Timoshenko. (As individual athletes not competing in team sports in Barcelona, they both competed under the Ukrainian flag.) In Barcelona, Timoshenko won the gold medal while Skaldina settled for bronze behind Spain's Carolina Pascual. In tears, she refused to acknowledge Pascual and shake  her hand during the medal ceremony, resulting in boos from the Spanish audience. She retired after the competition.

Personal life

She was married to three-time Olympian Dmitry Svatkovsky, an Olympic gold and silver medalist in modern pentathlon. They met at the 1992 Olympics in Barcelona and four years later had a daughter, Daria Svatkovskaya. Daria was a member of Russia's rhythmic gymnastics national team until a back injury forced her into in retirement in 2014.

After retiring from competition, Skaldina moved to Svatkovsky's hometown of Moscow and began coaching. She currently coaches at Sports School No. 74 and is a member of Russia's national team coaching staff. She is an Honoured Master of Sport for the Soviet Union and an Honoured Coach of Russia.

Notable trainees 
 Daria Svatkovskaya
 Lyasan Utiasheva
 Ksenia Dzhalaganiya
Alexandra Skubova

Detailed Olympic results

References

External links
 
 Oksana Skaldina at r-gymnastics.com 
 
 

1972 births
Living people
Soviet rhythmic gymnasts
Ukrainian rhythmic gymnasts
Deriugins Gymnasts
Russian gymnastics coaches
Olympic gymnasts of the Unified Team
Gymnasts at the 1992 Summer Olympics
Sportspeople from Zaporizhzhia
Olympic medalists in gymnastics
Ukrainian emigrants to Russia
Honoured Masters of Sport of the USSR
Honoured Coaches of Russia
Medalists at the 1992 Summer Olympics
Medalists at the Rhythmic Gymnastics World Championships
Olympic bronze medalists for the Unified Team
Goodwill Games medalists in gymnastics
Competitors at the 1990 Goodwill Games